Bestial Rites 2009–2012 is a compilation album by French death metal band Necrowretch. It was released on 22 October 2013 across Europe and North America on 5 November 2013 and is available on CD and digital download. The compilation contains tracks from previous demo and EP releases. The album track "Sadistic Expiation" was uploaded on Century Media's official YouTube channel.

Track listing

Personnel
Necrowretch
 Vlad – Vocals, Guitar
 Amphycion – Bass
 Blastphemator – Drums
 Mörkk – Drums

Additional musicians
 Rob – guest vocals on "Supposed to Rot" (Nihilist cover)

Miscellaneous staff
 Milovan Novakovic – cover artwork

References

External links

Necrowretch albums
Century Media Records albums
2013 compilation albums